Sasha Pieterse-Sheaffer (born February 17, 1996) is a South African-born American actress, singer and songwriter. She is known for her role as Alison DiLaurentis in the Freeform series Pretty Little Liars and its spin-off Pretty Little Liars: The Perfectionists. Upon the success of Pretty Little Liars, Pieterse earned a supporting role as Amy Loubalu in the 2011 Disney Channel film Geek Charming.

In 2013, she starred in the teen comedy film G.B.F.. In 2017, Pieterse participated in the 25th season of Dancing with the Stars and finished in 10th place.

Early life

Pieterse was born in Johannesburg, South Africa on February 17, 1996. Moving to the United States in 2001, she was raised in Las Vegas, before moving to Los Angeles. She became accustomed to a career in entertainment at an early age, as her parents were a professional acrobatic dance team who performed internationally. Pieterse was homeschooled and graduated at 14.

Career

Modeling
At four years old, Pieterse began modeling and appearing in commercials. She appeared in an advertisement for Wenner Bread Products at five years old, and later appeared on a national billboard for hair salon franchise SuperCuts and modeled for Macy's Passport fashion show. Pieterse appeared in numerous magazines, including on the covers of BELLO's "Young Hollywood" issue (December 2014), TeenProm (2015 issue), Seventeen (August 2016), Social Life (August 2019).

Film and television

At six years old, Pieterse got her start in television, co-starring in 2002 as Buffy on The WB's remake of the CBS sitcom Family Affair. She guest starred in the Stargate SG-1 episode “Grace” with Amanda Tapping as a little girl named Grace. In 2005, she appeared on an episode of House titled "Autopsy", portraying Andie, a young girl with terminal cancer. That same year, she made her film debut in The Adventures of Sharkboy and Lavagirl in 3-D as Marissa, the Ice Princess, and also appeared as Millie Rose for two episodes of the short-lived TNT series Wanted, alongside her former Family Affair co-star, Gary Cole.

Pieterse appeared in the 2007 film Good Luck Chuck, playing a young goth girl who places a curse on the titular character. She played the younger version of Sarah Michelle Gellar's character in the 2007 film The Air I Breathe, along with such co-stars as Kevin Bacon, Forest Whitaker, and Emile Hirsch. She also played a leading character in the Hallmark original film Claire, also released in 2007.

Pieterse was 13 years old in late 2009, when she was cast in the Freeform teen drama television series Pretty Little Liars (2010–2017) as Alison DiLaurentis, the former "queen bee" of her high school clique. She had a regular role in the series from the first four seasons, until later became a main role in the fifth season, with one of the five girls. Since its debut, the series has received mixed reviews from television critics, but remained a success for Freeform, garnering a large fandom. Pieterse reprised her role as Alison, in the spin-off series titled Pretty Little Liars: The Perfectionists on Freeform in 2019. On Pretty Little Liars: The Perfectionists, she portrayed the grown-up version of Alison who is working as a teaching assistant at Beacon Heights University.

Other roles Pieterse has had include a 2009 appearance in Without a Trace, and a recurring role as Amanda Strazzulla, an abandoned daughter, in Heroes. In 2011, she appeared as Amy Loubalu in the Disney Channel Original Movie Geek Charming, and also as a teenage girl in the film X-Men: First Class. More recently, Pieterse has appeared in the film G.B.F. and in an episode of Hawaii Five-0 as a terrorist pupil named Dawn Hatfield. Pieterse played Japonica Fenway, a young lady involved with cocaine, in the film Inherent Vice (2014), based on the novel of the same name by Thomas Pynchon. In September 2017, Pieterse was announced as one of the celebrities to compete on the Dancing with the Stars – season 25. She was paired with professional dancer Gleb Savchenko. They were the 4th couple eliminated, on October 16, 2017, finishing in 10th place.

On August 16, 2021, Deadline announced that Pieterse has been cast in Netflix's film adaptation of Annie Barrows’ New York Times bestselling book series Ivy + Bean alongside Jesse Tyler Ferguson, Jane Lynch and Nia Vardalos.

Music 
Pieterse describes her music as "country with southern rock". Her debut single "This Country is Bad Ass" was released on April 12, 2013. Pieterse described the patriotism behind the song: "I just love this country so much and I would never have been able to be where I am if I wasn't in America, so we decided to come up with this [track]." Her second single, "R.P.M", was released on June 13, 2013.

Her third single, "I Can't Fix You", was released on July 12, 2013. On December 10, 2013, she released her fourth single "No", an upbeat track about "standing strong in your convictions" and saying no when an unfaithful, lying ex-boyfriend asks for a second chance.

Other ventures
Her cookbook Sasha in Good Taste: Recipes for Bites, Feasts, Sips & Celebrations was published by Dey Street Books, an imprint of HarperCollins on October 8, 2019. In the book Pieterse shares cooking and baking recipes, tips for inexpensive party planning, do it yourself projects and ideas for desserts. San Francisco Book Review wrote that the book is "full of good ideas".

She also has a lifestyle website called "Sasha in Good Taste".

Pieterse has developed an online and social media presence, including 16 million+ followers on Instagram as of January 2023. She endorses products such as beauty and wellness products on Instagram and has partnered with Lightlife Foods, and Pokemon Go.

Philanthropy 
In June 2019, Pieterse and her husband worked together with Habitat for Humanity to help build houses in New Orleans.

Personal life
On December 22, 2015, Pieterse became engaged to her long-term boyfriend Hudson Sheaffer. They were married on May 27, 2018 at Castle Leslie in Glaslough, Ireland. On May 27, 2020, Pieterse announced that she and Sheaffer were expecting their first child. Their son was born in November 2020. As of 2022, the family resides in Nashville, Tennessee.

At the start of season 25 of Dancing with the Stars, Pieterse revealed that she was diagnosed with polycystic ovary syndrome, which causes symptoms such as irregular periods and weight gain.

Filmography

Film

Television

Music videos

Awards and nominations

Bibliography
 Pieterse, Sasha (2019). Sasha in Good Taste: Recipes for Bites, Feasts, Sips & Celebrations. Dey Street Books.

References

External links

 

1996 births
21st-century American actresses
21st-century American singers
Actresses from Los Angeles
Actresses from Nevada
Afrikaner people
American child actresses
American child models
American country singer-songwriters
American women country singers
American female models
American film actresses
American television actresses
Living people
People from Johannesburg
People from the Las Vegas Valley
South African emigrants to the United States
21st-century American women singers
Singer-songwriters from Nevada